Virginia High School, home of the Blue Devils, educates students grades 712 in Virginia, Minnesota, United States. It is a public high school with open enrollment located across from the Saint Louis County District Courthouse on scenic 5th Avenue. Virginia High School has a strong music department known for the Marching Blues, the school's marching band. The A Capella choir is directed by Matthew Krage. The high school also participates in Minnesota State High School League sports such as hockey, basketball, volleyball, tennis, football, track & field, cross country, baseball, swimming, golf, soccer and wrestling. Despite budget problems in the past decade due to declining enrollment, Virginia Secondary has had success in standardized state testing, graduation rates, and school pride. Enrollment has been at a slow decline for the last few decades (as has the city of Virginia's population) but enrollment has been increasing in the lower grade levels, and open enrollment from neighboring districts has brought new students to the school.
Students are unofficially divided into grades 7 & 8 and 9-12. The school day consists of 7 periods ranging from 51 to 52 minutes with 3 to 5 minutes passing time allowed. Other Wednesday, students get out of school an hour early to allow for faculty professional development meetings. Junior high students have a closed lunch period between 3rd and 4th hours while grades 912 enjoy an open lunch after 4th hour.

School District History

Parkview Learning Center, the district's newest free-standing facility, currently serves pre-Kindergarten students through second grade. It was remodeled and expanded during the 2015-2016 school year to accommodate increasing enrollment in the lower grade levels and to expand the district's Early Childhood Family Education and Head Start programs.

School Activities

Music Department

The Virginia School District has a 6th grade band, junior high band (grades 78), Concert Band (grades 912), and Wind Ensemble (grades 912, audition only). Each group generally plays concerts in the Goodman Auditorium three times a year. 912 grade students participate in the Virginia Marching Blues, the high school's marching band, which performs at the annual Land of the Loon festival, in 4 July parades, and other events. Mr. Joshua Biles directs all high school bands as of the 20162017 school year.
Virginia High School also has a large choir program under the direction of Mr. Matthew Krage. Available programs include 7th grade choir, 8th grade choir, Varsity choir (senior high), and a cappella Choir (audition only).
Mrs. Sheila Wilcox directs the Junior and Senior High Orchestras. The orchestras are a cooperative program with the neighboring Eveleth-Gilbert School District. The junior high orchestra meets in Gilbert, while senior high students meet in Virginia. The orchestras perform three yearly concerts and participate in honor groups.

Knowledge Bowl Teams

Virginia is part of Minnesota's northeast region of knowledge bowl. The competitive levels are elementary, junior high, junior varsity, and varsity. Varsity teams have a chance to make it to state in Brainerd, Minnesota; while the other divisions can win the regional tournament held at the Northeast Service Cooperative building in Mountain Iron. Virginia has sent teams to the State Tournament in 2009, 2010, 2013, and 2017.

The Urban Edge

The Urban Edge is a student-run coffee shop managed by business teacher Kyle Hammer.

Snow Week

Snow Week is a Homecoming-like celebration during January/February. The celebrations feature performances from student bands and dance groups. A Snow Week king and queen are crowned, as are a freshman prince and princess. Homecoming and Snow Week are hosted and organized by the Student Council.

Concurrent enrollment
Concurrent enrollment with Mesabi Range Community & Technical College and Vermilion Community College is an option many juniors and seniors consider when getting ready for college. The program (known at some institutions as College in the Schools) allows for qualified students to gain college credit without leaving the high school campus through challenging courses with collegiate formats in lectures, assignments and grading. Many of the credits earned transfer to 4 year institutions across Minnesota. Virginia Secondary also has partnerships with other eastern Iron Range school districts for vocational classes ranging from nursing to accounting.

See also
List of high schools in Minnesota

References

External links
Virginia Schools Home page

Public middle schools in Minnesota
Public high schools in Minnesota
Schools in St. Louis County, Minnesota
Virginia, Minnesota